Julius Schaub (20 August 1898 – 27 December 1967) was the chief aide and adjutant to German dictator Adolf Hitler until the dictator's suicide on 30 April 1945.

Born in 1898 in Munich, Bavaria, Schaub served as a field medic during World War I, during which he injured both of his feet. During the hard times which followed the War, Schaub joined the Nazi Party. After losing his job because of his membership, Hitler hired him as his personal aide, a position he held for 25 years.

Schaub took care of Hitler's personal belongings, papers and travel journeys, making him a notable figure in Hitler's inner circle. In 1924, he was imprisoned with Hitler for his involvement in the coup d'état attempt of November 1923 in Munich. In time he closely befriended Hitler. Later in July 1944, Schaub was not present during the military briefing in a Wolfsschanze barrack in which a bomb exploded in an attempt on Hitler's life, killing four people and injuring twenty others. Schaub was in another building in the complex.

Schaub was ordered to leave the Führerbunker in late April 1945 and destroy all of Hitler's personal belongings and papers. He was arrested by the Americans on 8 May 1945. Schaub died on 27 December 1967 in Munich.

Early life
Julius Schaub was born on 20 August 1898 in Munich, a largely Catholic city in southern Bavaria. On 28 June 1914, Archduke Franz Ferdinand of Austria and his wife were assassinated by a group of Serbian and Bosnian rebels. This triggered the outbreak of World War I in Europe. On 17 January 1917, Schaub was drafted to serve as a field medic in the German Army. According to Traudl Junge, one of Hitler's private secretaries, both of Schaub's feet had been injured in the war, making him semi-handicapped. By the end of the war, Schaub found work as a contract worker at the Munich Central Supply Office.

Association with Hitler

After defeat in World War I, Germany was plunged into bankruptcy, social injustice, poverty, crime and mass unemployment. During these depressing years, Germany saw the creation of a number of extremist political and paramilitary associations, representing both the far-left and the far-right. Amidst this crisis, Schaub decided to join the National Socialist German Workers Party, later commonly known as the Nazi Party; he became member #81. The political program of the party was essentially a rejection of the terms of the Treaty of Versailles and an embrace of antisemitism and anti-Bolshevism, driven by Adolf Hitler and his world view.

After getting involved with the Nazi Party, Schaub lost his job at the Munich Central Supply Office. Upon hearing the news, Hitler hired him as his personal aide-de-camp. Thereafter, Schaub looked after his confidential papers, carried money for Hitler's use and provided both secretary and security duties.

In 1923, the Nazis felt strong enough to try to seize power in Munich. They decided to march on the city, inspired by Benito Mussolini's successful march on Rome. Known as the Beer Hall Putsch, Hitler and his paramilitary Sturmabteilung (SA) troops failed to take control of Munich. Schaub and other Nazis were arrested and imprisoned with Hitler at Landsberg Prison. After Hitler's release from prison, there was an official reformation of the Nazi Party in early 1925. Schaub also became a founding member of the Schutzstaffel (SS), documented as member #7. 

Schaub continued in the capacity as a personal aide and adjutant for Hitler. A friendship developed, which was evident by Hitler later appearing as a witness at Schaub's second wedding. Traudl Junge states that Schaub considered himself to be an "amazingly important, significant person" to the Nazi cause. The Luftwaffe chief Hermann Göring, who gave humorous nicknames to almost all in Hitler's inner circle, dubbed Schaub the Reisemarschal ("Travel Marshal") as he typically took care of Hitler's traveling arrangements and often accompanied him. On automobile trips, Schaub was one of the few who was allowed to travel regularly in Hitler's personal motorcar. He later became Hitler's chief aide and adjutant (Chefadjutant des Führers) in October 1940. Thereafter, he would give day-to-day operational orders to Hitler's personal protection chief, Johann Rattenhuber of the Reichssicherheitsdienst (Reich Security Service; RSD). In 1943, he was promoted to his final rank of SS-Obergruppenführer. As Hitler disliked change in personnel and liked to keep familiar faces around him, Schaub remained in Hitler's staff for 25 years.

20 July plot

Later during World War II, with Germany suffering major defeat on all fronts, Colonel Claus von Stauffenberg and his fellow conspirators decided to eliminate Hitler and the Nazi leadership, establish a new government and save Germany from total destruction. Stauffenberg had his opportunity on 20 July 1944 at a military briefing at Hitler's East Prussian headquarters known as the Wolf's Lair (Wolfsschanze). He managed to get through security and plant a briefcase bomb under the conference table. The bomb exploded, fatally wounding three officers and a stenographer who died shortly thereafter. Schaub was in another building at the time of the explosion. He rushed over to find Hitler, who survived with only minor injuries, as did other men present, who were shielded from the bomb blast by the conference table leg.

In the aftermath of the event, Hitler had a badge struck to honor all those injured or killed in the explosion; the "20 July Wound Badge". Those present at the conference later said that Schaub falsely tried to claim he was injured so as to qualify for the badge.

1945
In January 1945, Hitler and his staff relocated to the Führerbunker in Berlin. During the Battle of Berlin midday conference of 22 April, Hitler declaredfor the first timethat the war was lost. Hitler ordered Schaub to burn all of the documents from his safe in the bunker and two safes in the Reich Chancellery. Schaub performed the task on 22 or 23 April 1945. In the next several days, Hitler ordered much of his personal staff to leave Berlin. Hitler also ordered Schaub to burn the contents of the dictator's personal safes in Munich and at the Berghof on the Obersalzberg. His final act as aide and adjutant was to destroy Hitler's personal train, the Führersonderzug, in Austria.

Later life and death
After the war, while possessing false identification papers and introducing himself as "Josef Huber", Schaub was arrested by American troops on 8 May 1945 in Kitzbühel, and remained in custody until 17 February 1949. Ultimately, Schaub was classified by denazification investigators as being only a "fellow traveler" and was not accused or associated with any war crimes. Schaub died on 27 December 1967 in his hometown, Munich. Traudl Junge described Schaub in her memoirs as "extremely kind, but very curious too". She further notes that "for historical purposes, it's not worth saying much about him".

See also

Heinz Linge
Hans Hermann Junge
List SS-Obergruppenführer

References

Citations

Bibliography

Online
 

1898 births
1967 deaths
SS-Obergruppenführer
Military personnel from Munich
Members of the Reichstag of Nazi Germany
Burials at the Ostfriedhof (Munich)
People from the Kingdom of Bavaria
Adjutants of Adolf Hitler
20th-century Freikorps personnel